Itaballia marana is a butterfly in the family Pieridae. It is found in Ecuador.

The larvae possibly feed on the leaves of Capparis species.

References

Pierini
Butterflies described in 1844
Taxa named by Edward Doubleday